Richard Lewis Page (born 22 February 1941) is a former Conservative Member of Parliament (MP) in the United Kingdom from 1976 to 1979 and from December 1979 to 2005.

Early life
Born the son of Victor Charles Page, he went to the independent Hurstpierpoint College in West Sussex and Luton Technical College, gaining a HNC in Mechanical Engineering in 1962. He was an apprentice at Vauxhall Motors in Luton from 1959 to 1963, and then worked for Page Holdings, becoming the Chairman from 1985 to 1995 and 1997 onwards.

He was member of the Young Conservatives from 1964 to 1966 and from 1968 to 1971, he was a district councillor in Banstead, Surrey.

Parliamentary career
Page contested Workington in the February and October 1974 elections. He won the seat in the by-election caused by the elevation of Labour's Fred Peart to the House of Lords in 1976, becoming the first Conservative to represent the constituency since it was created in 1918, before losing the seat in May 1979. Page was not out of Parliament long as he subsequently won the safe Conservative seat of South West Hertfordshire in a by-election in December that year. He is therefore distinguished as one of a handful of MPs who have been successful in two by-elections.

He served as Private Parliamentary Secretary to the Secretary of State for Trade (John Biffen) from 1981 to 1982 and then to the Leader of the House (John Biffen) from 1983 to 1987. He was the Parliamentary Under-Secretary of State at the Department of Trade and Industry under John Major, with responsibility for small business, Sustainable energy, biotechnology, coal, oil and BNFL (Nuclear Energy). He then was appointed as the opposition front-bench spokesman on Trade and Industry from 2000 to 2001

He was the lead minister in the privatisation of AEA Technology, and used his knowledge of the private members' ballot procedure to be successful with two private members' bills from the single private members' ballot slot. Page moved a 10-minute rule bill to reduce the number of MPs, claiming it could allow MPs to be better paid and save the state money.

Page was a Member of the Public Accounts Committee in the years 1987-95 and 1997–2000. He was also the Vice-Chairman of: the Conservative Trade and Industry Committee from 1988 to 1995; the All Party Engineering Group from 1997 to 2005; and the All Party Chemistry Group from 1997 to 2005. He was the Joint Chairman of the All-Party Racing and Bloodstock Committee from 1998 to 2005 and Chairman of the All Party Parliamentary Scientific Committee from 2003 to 2005. He was also International Chairman of the Conservative's Central Office from 1999 to 2000 and the Governor of the Foundation for Western Democracy from 1998 to 2000.

He was one of only 13 Conservative MPs who spoke and voted against the decision to invade Iraq (18 March 2003) and the way the re-construction progressed. He stepped down from the House of Commons at the 2005 General Election due to his wife's ill health.

Later life

He was Governor of the Royal Masonic School from 1984 to 1995 and from 1999 to 2013. He was Honorary Treasurer of The Leukamia Research Fund from 1991 to 1995, and has been Chairman of Keep Southwater Green since 2015. He was the master of the Worshipful Company of Pattenmakers.

References

External links
 
 They Work For You

1941 births
Living people
People educated at Hurstpierpoint College
Alumni of the University of Bedfordshire
Conservative Party (UK) MPs for English constituencies
Cumbria MPs
UK MPs 1974–1979
UK MPs 1979–1983
UK MPs 1983–1987
UK MPs 1987–1992
UK MPs 1992–1997
UK MPs 1997–2001
UK MPs 2001–2005
Politics of Dacorum